Oog is a town in the Sool region of Somaliland, situated in the Aynaba district. It is located between Aynaba and Las Anod.

Overview 
Oog acts as the junction of the road connecting the regional capitals of Burao and Erigavo. Oog is situated on Somaliland's main road connecting towns and cities like Borama, Hargeisa, Berbera and Burao to Somalia.

 north of Oog is the nearby town of Badweyn, home to a substantial mosque and a multiple-trunked tree that stands alongside the main road.

South of Oog, in the Haud, the rare collared lark can be found as well as the native dibatag antelope.

Oog is home to a Somaliland National Army base.

Demographics 
A book published in England in 1951 lists Oog first as the home well of the Omr Jibrh and Adarahman Musa branches of the Habr Je'lo clan.

According to a book published in 2014, Oog is inhabited  majority by the Adarahman musa subclan Bare Adarahman sub-clan  Ali bare Musa Abakor sub-clan of the Habr Je'lo clan, and the Sa'ad Yonis sub-clan of the Garhajis clan of the Habar Yoonis clan, both part of the larger Isaaq clan-family.

History

Before Independence
Oog is written as "Ok" in a book published in England in 1951 as the coordinate .

In February 1919, Oog was attacked by Mullah's forces.

Around the declaration of independence of Somaliland

On 2 February 1991, the SNM and a Dhulbahante delegation led by Garaad Abdiqani held a meeting in Oog, where ceasefire was agreed upon.

In October 1991, Habar Yunis, Habar Je'lo, and Dhulbahante held a Peace Conference at Oog.

Recent History
In 2008, one of the diaspora returned from the U.S. and attempted to convert his grazing lands to fields in Oog, which led to serious conflict between the clans.

In December 2011, a large delegation led by the Speaker of the House of Representatives of Somaliland and the Chairman of the Waddani visited Oog.

In April 2012, Somtel's office was opened in Oog, and the mayor and others attended the event.

In August 2013, fighting broke out between clans in the Oog region, resulting in deaths. A delegation led by the Somaliland Minister of Interior was sent to intercede. At that time, it took only three days to resolve the issue through the efforts of national elders and others.

In January 2014, a murder in the Oog neighborhood led to fighting in Gowsaweyne between Sa'ad Yonis and Jama Siyad that resulted in deaths.

In November 2018, the Somaliland Water Development Agency installed new wells in the towns of Oog and Wadamago.

In 2019, toxic Mesquite (Prosopis juliflora) bred and damaged livestock.

In April 2019, two policemen were killed on the road connecting Garadag and Oog, causing an inter-clan struggle.

See also
Administrative divisions of Somaliland
Regions of Somaliland
Districts of Somaliland
Somalia–Somaliland border

References
Populated places in Sool, Somaliland